Celestinas Jucys (Russian name: Целестинас Юцис; born 18 January 1939) is a Soviet rower from Lithuania. He competed at the 1964 Summer Olympics in Tokyo with the men's coxed four where they came seventh.

References

1939 births
Living people
Soviet male rowers
Olympic rowers of the Soviet Union
Rowers at the 1964 Summer Olympics
Lithuanian male rowers
Sportspeople from Klaipėda